The Women's National Republican Club is the oldest private club for Republican women in the United States, and was founded by Henrietta Wells Livermore in 1921. The club grew out of the earlier women's suffrage movement in New York which led to the Nineteenth Amendment. The club built its third and current home at 23 West 51st Street, New York City in 1934.  That Neo-Georgian style building was built on the former site of Andrew Carnegie's home and was listed on the National Register of Historic Places in 2013.

The club continues to serve its members with guest rooms and dining, in addition to political lectures.  It allows men to join as associate members.

References

External links

1921 establishments in New York City
1934 establishments in New York City
Clubhouses on the National Register of Historic Places in Manhattan
Midtown Manhattan
Women in New York City
Women's clubs in the United States